Joseph Radmore is a paralympic athlete from Canada competing mainly in category T52 sprint events.

Joseph has competed in three Paralympics.  His first in 1996 was his most successful, winning a silver in the 100m as well as competing in the 400m.  In the 2000 Summer Paralympics he competed in all three sprints but was unable to win any medals.  He also failed to win a medal in the 100m in the 2004 Summer Paralympics.

References

Paralympic track and field athletes of Canada
Athletes (track and field) at the 1996 Summer Paralympics
Athletes (track and field) at the 2000 Summer Paralympics
Athletes (track and field) at the 2004 Summer Paralympics
Paralympic silver medalists for Canada
Canadian male wheelchair racers
Living people
Medalists at the 1996 Summer Paralympics
Year of birth missing (living people)
Paralympic medalists in athletics (track and field)